Guigues III (died 1203), also numbered Guigues IV, nicknamed Branda, was the count of Forez from 1199 until his death while on the Fourth Crusade.

In 1202, he was at Lyon preparing to leave on crusade when he issued a charter in favour of his father's monastery. According to Geoffrey of Villehardouin, he and Bishop Walter of Autun did not travel with the main army, but took ship at Marseille direct for the Holy Land. They were accompanied by an army of 300 knights and sergeants. According to the Chronicle of Ernoul, he died shortly after his arrival in Acre in 1203. He was buried in the Hospitaller church of Saint John in Acre. In 1215, his brother, Archbishop Renaud of Lyon, donated money for an annual celebration on the anniversary of Guigues's death at the hospital of Montbrison, a family foundation.

Guigues's first wife was Asiurra, with whom he had a daughter, name unknown, who married William the Old, lord of Baffie. He divorced his first wife and married Alix, with whom he had three children: Guigues IV, who succeeded him; Guigonne, who married Count Gerard II of Mâcon; and Marquise, who married Guy VI, viscount of Thiers.

Notes

Bibliography

1203 deaths
Counts of Forez
Christians of the Fourth Crusade
12th-century French people
13th-century French people